Sifié is a town in western Ivory Coast. It is a sub-prefecture and commune of Séguéla Department in Worodougou Region, Woroba District.
In 2014, the population of the sub-prefecture of Séguéla was 63,774.

Villages
The twenty villages of the sub-prefecture of Sifié and their population in 2014 are:

Notes

Sub-prefectures of Worodougou
Communes of Worodougou